"Lost" is a song by American rock band Linkin Park. Originally recorded during sessions for their second studio album, Meteora (2003), it was later officially released on February 10, 2023, as the first single from the album's  20th-anniversary reissue.

Background
The song was initially recorded in 2002 when Linkin Park was recording material for their second studio album, Meteora (2003). After the band hinted at releasing material in the second half of January 2023 by teasing countdowns and scavenger hunts on their website, the song was officially released on February 10, 2023, in promotion of the band's 20th anniversary re-release of Meteora.

Mike Shinoda wrote, "Finding 'Lost' was like finding a favorite photo you had forgotten you'd taken, like it was waiting for the right moment to reveal itself". According to Shinoda, fans had been asking for songs containing the late lead vocalist Chester Bennington's voice for years, and stated that "Lost" is one of more unreleased tracks featuring Bennington's vocals to be included on the 20th anniversary edition of Meteora.

Composition
"Lost" has been described as a nu metal song with electronic elements. It was noted that "Lost" is sonically similar to "Breaking the Habit" and "Numb".

Music video
The band released an anime-inspired AI-generated video for the song on February 10, 2023. It features clips from the Live In Texas performance, The Making Of Meteora documentary, the "New Divide", "Somewhere I Belong", and "Breaking the Habit" music videos, and Maciej Kuciara and pplpleasr's animation "White Rabbit". It was created by producers and animators Maciej Kuciara and pplpleasr.

Personnel
Linkin Park
 Chester Bennington – lead vocals
 Mike Shinoda – vocals, keyboards, sampler
 Brad Delson – guitars
 Joe Hahn – turntables, samples
 Rob Bourdon – drums
 Dave Farrell – bass guitar

Charts

Release history

References

2023 singles
2002 songs
Linkin Park songs
Songs released posthumously
Songs written by Brad Delson
Songs written by Chester Bennington
Songs written by Mike Shinoda
Warner Records singles